Samir Bekrić (born 20 October 1984) is a Bosnian professional footballer who plays as a midfielder for Bosnian Premier League club Željezničar.

Club career

Early career
Bekrić started his professional career in 2003 joining Gradina. He stayed at Gradina until 2006.

Željezničar
In January 2007, Bekrić joined Željezničar. In the 2009–10 season, Bekrić was one of the best players of Željezničar, scoring 15 goals. He also had 13 assists. That season he won the Bosnian Premier League with the club.

South Korea and Kazahstan
After a successful period at Željezničar, Bekrić had stints in South Korea with Incheon United and in Kazakhstan with Tobol.

Return to Željezničar
In February 2012, Bekrić came back to Željezničar and that same year won the league title and the Bosnian Cup. In 2013, he again won the league title with Željezničar. Bekrić left the club that year.

Iran
In 2013, Bekrić went to Iran and stayed there until 2014. While there, he played for Mes Kerman and Fajr Sepasi.

Bunyodkor
In July 2014, Bekrić joined Uzbekistan Super League club Bunyodkor. He played for the club until late 2015.

Second return to Željezničar
On 14 January 2016, Bekrić, for a second time, came back to Željezničar and played at the club until he left it in January 2018.

Zrinjski Mostar
On 19 February 2018, Bekrić signed with Zrinjski Mostar. In May 2018, he won the league with Zrinjski. On 20 June 2019, Bekrić left Zrinjski after his contract with the club expired.

Sloboda Tuzla
On 9 July 2019, Bekrić signed a two-year contract with Sloboda Tuzla. He made his official debut for Sloboda on 21 July 2019, in a 2–1 home-league win against Radnik Bijeljina. Bekrić scored his first official goal for Sloboda on 17 August 2019, in a 2–2 away league draw against his former club Željezničar. He left the club after his contract expired on 22 June 2020.

Third return to Željezničar
Five days after leaving Sloboda, on 27 June 2020, Bekrić returned to Željezničar for a third time and signed a one-year contract with the club. He played his first official game since his return on 1 August 2020, a league match against Velež Mostar.

Bekrić made his 200th appearance for Željezničar on 30 September 2020, in a cup game against Budućnost Banovići. He scored his first goal for the club since his return in a league match against Tuzla City on 5 October 2020.

On 4 June 2021, Bekrić extended his contract with Željezničar until June 2022.

International career
He made his debut for Bosnia and Herzegovina in a June 2009 friendly match against Uzbekistan, coming on as a late substitute for Velibor Đurić. It remained his sole international appearance.

Career statistics

International
Source:

Honours
Željezničar 
Bosnian Premier League: 2009–10, 2011–12, 2012–13
Bosnian Cup: 2011–12

Zrinjski Mostar 
Bosnian Premier League: 2017–18

References

External links

1984 births
Living people
Sportspeople from Tuzla
Association football midfielders
Bosnia and Herzegovina footballers
Bosnia and Herzegovina international footballers
FK Željezničar Sarajevo players
Incheon United FC players
FC Tobol players
Sanat Mes Kerman F.C. players
Fajr Sepasi players
FC Bunyodkor players
HŠK Zrinjski Mostar players
FK Sloboda Tuzla players
Premier League of Bosnia and Herzegovina players
K League 1 players
Kazakhstan Premier League players
Persian Gulf Pro League players
Uzbekistan Super League players
Bosnia and Herzegovina expatriate footballers
Expatriate footballers in South Korea
Bosnia and Herzegovina expatriate sportspeople in South Korea
Expatriate footballers in Kazakhstan
Bosnia and Herzegovina expatriate sportspeople in Kazakhstan
Expatriate footballers in Iran
Bosnia and Herzegovina expatriate sportspeople in Iran
Expatriate footballers in Uzbekistan
Bosnia and Herzegovina expatriate sportspeople in Uzbekistan